The Cadet World Championship are international sailing regattas in the Cadet class organized by the International Sailing Federation and the International Cadet Class Association.

International Cadet Week
(The Cadet champions from 1950 up to and including 1966 won the International Cadet Week, the forerunner of the World Championships).
1950 – Burnham-on-Crouch, England – D Thorpe / R Pratt (GBR)
1951 – Burnham-on-Crouch, England – R Ellis / B Ellis (GBR)
1952 – Burnham-on-Crouch, England – B W Appleton / R Vines (GBR)
1953 – Burnham-on-Crouch, England – B Ellis / R Walsh (GBR)
1954 – Burnham-on-Crouch, England – B Ellis / R Walsh (GBR)
1955 – Burnham-on-Crouch, England – B Ellis / Walsh (GBR)
1956 – Burnham-on-Crouch, England – J Prosser / P Assheton (GBR)
1957 – Burnham-on-Crouch, England – B Steel / R Steel (GBR)
1958 – Burnham-on-Crouch, England – P van Godsenhoven / R Joski (BEL)
1959 – Burnham-on-Crouch, England – J Rogge / P Rogge (BEL)
1960 – Burnham-on-Crouch, England – R Pattisson / J Pattisson (GBR)
1961 – Burnham-on-Crouch, England – P Bateman / T Jenkins (GBR)
1962 – Burnham-on-Crouch, England – S Clifford / A Harden (GBR) and Georges Wackens/Annette Verhaegen (BEL) Tied - the only occasion this has occurred
1963 – Burnham-on-Crouch, England – I Gray / I Gray (GBR)
1964 – Burnham-on-Crouch, England – M Harrison / A Tucker (GBR)
1965 – Plymouth, England – N Boult / D Long (GBR)
1966 – Plymouth, England – B Wyszkowsk / A Nowicki (POL)

World Championships

References

 
Recurring sporting events established in 1967